El Siglo de Torreón is a Mexican daily newspaper based in Comarca Lagunera, Mexico. It was founded in 1922 in Torreón, Coahuila by Antonio de Juambelz y Bracho under the direction of Joaquin Moreno.

History
In 1921, Antonio de Juambelz y Bracho was dedicated to the edition of a newspaper in the capital of Coahuila that promoted the candidacy for governor of Gral. Arnulfo González, and when he became governor, the newspaper disappeared. Antonio de Juambelz already had extensive experience in the journalistic field, so Joaquín Moreno invited him to the city of Torreón to start with the project of a regional newspaper, calling himself "Defender of the Community."

The first printing machine was obtained from the then governor of the state of Durango, he never refused to donate it because Joaquín Moreno, Antonio de Juambelz was appointed sub-manager while Mr. Moreno himself was the managing director of the nascent company.

With few sources and some people who "knew something", the first issue of the newspaper "El Siglo" began to be published. It was on September 22 when it was ready to be printed, but mechanical failures prevented it from being ready for the next day, and it was until February 28, 1922, when "El Siglo" was heard on the streets for the first time.

In 1925, due to an illness, Joaquín Moreno was forced to leave management and was replaced by José E. Campos, who had already worked for El Excélsior , a newspaper with national circulation. Mr. Campos modified many of the aspects of the edition, giving it a more modern touch, but Campos felt strange in the province and directing a newspaper that was barely growing, so he returned to the capital of the country; It was then that Antonio de Juambelz took the reins of this project.

Current directors
 Founder: Antonio de Juambelz
 Managing Director: Antonio González-Karg de Juambelz
 Deputy General Manager: Alfonso González-Karg de Juambelz
 Director of Operations: Enrique Irazoqui Morales
 President of the Council: Patricia González-Karg de Juambelz
 Council Vice President: Enriqueta Morales de Irazoqui
 Deputy Director of Finance: María del Socorro Soto Navarrete
 Editorial Sub-Director: Yohan Uribe Jiménez

See also
 List of newspapers in Mexico

External links 
 Official site

Mass media in Torreón
Newspapers published in Mexico
Publications established in 1922
Spanish-language newspapers

References